Alerheim is a municipality in the district of Donau-Ries in Bavaria in Germany.

Mayor
In January 2022 Alexander Joas was elected mayor. He succeeded Christoph Schmid, who had been in office since 2008.

Sons and daughters of the community 

 Johann Wilhelm Klein (1765-1848), pioneer of education for blind people
 Wilhelm Schmidt (1888-1962), politician, (Economic Reconstruction Union), German Party (1947))

References

Donau-Ries